Will Haven is a noise metal band from Sacramento, California. Formed in 1995, the group issued albums through many labels and have toured with acts such as Deftones and Soulfly before going on a hiatus in 2002. They would regroup in 2005 and continue to record and tour since. Throughout their history, they have issued 6 full-length albums (the latest being Muerte in 2018) as well as 2 EPs and a live DVD. Their musical style has been noted to be a combination of many metal and hardcore subgenres.

History
In 1995, Will Haven, named after a fictional, self-created character, formed and released a six-track demo. The band was formed from members of Sock, a band that was formed with Shaun Lopez of Far. Will Haven's debut self-titled seven-track EP was released in 1996 to positive reviews. A year later the quartet was signed to Revelation. Singer Grady Avenell guested on two Far tracks - 9 Miles, and a cover of Band Aid's Do They Know It's Christmas Time? with Chino Moreno of Deftones.

1997 saw the release of full-length El Diablo bringing them an increasing amount of attention and a growing fanbase. In 1999, they released WHVN, arguably their heaviest album to date.  The song Jaworski is named after Red Tape's frontman and friend Jeff Jaworski, who was Jeff Irwin's guitar tech at the time; and Slopez is named after Shaun Lopez, who was the guitarist for Far. During this time, the band recorded a track called The Regulator for the Bad Brains' Never Give In tribute album, and toured with Deftones throughout Europe.

In 2000, long-time drummer Wayne Morse left the band.  He was replaced by Mitch Wheeler.  Later that year, Grady guested on Soulfly's track Pain, to be featured on the album Primitive.  Chino Moreno also guested on that track.

In 2001, they released the critically acclaimed Carpe Diem, which saw a world-tour promotion, headlining shows in the US, UK, and Japan, and playing the Vans Warped Tour in Australia. Single Carpe Diem featured Chino Moreno in the promotional video; similarly, members of Haven are in the promotional video for Deftones' Bored, a single from their album Adrenaline.

Singer Grady Avenell left not long after the tour, to raise a family and attend college. Haven released a DVD called Foreign Films featuring what, at that point, was to be their last ever show in January 2003 - in a small coffeehouse in their hometown of Sacramento, called The Capitol Garage - and a wealth of footage from the final tour. Members of the band went on to form Ghostride (with members of Tinfed and Oddman), the Abominable Iron Sloth, and Death Valley High, as well as their own label, Distruktor Records.

Regrouping
On October 12, 2005, Will Haven officially regrouped and began writing new songs with original singer Grady Avenell and had initially planned to release a five-song EP with B-sides; however, during the writing process, the band decided to put out a full-length album. Haven, now a five-piece with guitarist Cayle Hunter from Ghostride and Oddman, went to Los Angeles to record 12 songs for the new album; guitarist Jeff Irwin told Rocksound: "If this is the last record we ever do, then i want it to be our ultimate one -- the one that's absolutely perfect".

In January 2006, Haven returned to the stage with a show in Sacramento's Boardwalk. In February, new song "Handlebars to Freedom" was uploaded to their MySpace profile. In March, they traveled to the UK, for a co-headlining tour with Crowbar. Avenell was announced unable to perform at the Will Haven dates in Glasgow and Newport, due to problems with his wife in Paris, so Simon Neil of Biffy Clyro, Craig B of Aereogramme, Mikey Dee of Skindred, Crowbar frontman, Kirk Windstein and XSheepX of The Seventh Cross were asked to do guest vocals for both nights. Grady rejoined the band at the following dates. The band had plans for tours through Europe, Australia and a summer tour with the Deftones, but so far, this hasn't happened yet.

As of August 2006, Will Haven signed a record deal with indie label Bieler Bros. Records. The demos that have been online won't appear on this record. One of the demos, "Handlebars To Freedom", will appear on a compilation disc of new Australian label Static Migration Records. Second guitarist Cayle Hunter was fired by the band and focused on his band Armed for the Apocalypse.

On February 19, 2007, Will Haven played a free show at the Troubadour in Los Angeles, promising a 'big announcement' would be made at the show – namely that Avenell had left the band and been replaced by longtime friend of the band (and vocalist for Sacramento punk band Red Tape) Jeff Jaworski. In spring 2007, the band went to Europe with Deftones.

The band released the album The Hierophant on June 18, 2007 (UK) and June 19, 2007, in the US. A post made by guitarist Jeff Irwin on an unofficial message board stated that the band intend to tour the new material later on in 2007.

A headline UK tour eventually followed in November 2007 without Mike Martin on bass; however no explanation has been given for his absence. Bass duties for the tour were covered by long-time friend Rey Osburn.

In September 2008, Will Haven embarked on a headlining European tour with French band My Own Private Alaska and further support differing per city. Again Reyka Osburn played bass, as Mike Martin was raising a family.

On October 12, 2009, the following was said about Grady rejoining the group: "After a little time off and doing a few benefit shows for our brother Chi Cheng of the Deftones, we are back to work. As some of you may have seen Grady did join us for a few of the benefit shows we did for Chi and also an amazing show in San Francisco a few months ago. After those shows we had a few discussions about will havens future and Grady expressed that he would like to be a part of it. So after working out details I am very happy to say that we are currently working on a new record with Grady handling the vocal duties. Jeff Jaworski will still be a big part of the band and helping with the writing process on the new record. So we are more than excited to be all working together on making an amazing record."

In April 2010, the band announced that Chris Fehn would be assuming bass duties for their upcoming album and tours, replacing Mike Martin.

An EP titled Open the Mind to Discomfort was released in May 2015 via Artery Recordings.

A full-length LP titled Muerte was released via Minus Head in March 2018, with guest appearances from Mike Scheidt of Yob and Stephen Carpenter of Deftones.

Members

Current members
 Grady Avenell – vocals (1995–2002, 2005–2007, 2009–present)
 Jeff Irwin – guitar (1995–2002, 2005–present)
 Mitch Wheeler – drums (2000–2002, 2005–present)
 Anthony Paganelli – guitar (2007–present)
 Adrien Contreras – bass guitar (2012–present), keyboards (2010-2012)

Former Members
 Mike Martin – bass guitar (1995–2002, 2005-2010)
 Jeff Jaworski – vocals (2007–2009)
 Cayle Hunter – guitar (2005–2006)
 Wayne Morse – drums (1995–2000)
 Dave Hulse – drums (2000)
 Chris Robyn – drums (2000)
 Chris Fehn – bass guitar (2010–2012)

Touring Members
 Reyka Osburn – bass (2008–2009)

Timeline

Discography

Studio albums

Demo albums

EPs

Singles

Video albums

Other appearances
 1995 – Far – Grady guests on the song "9 Miles"
 1995 – Far The Bands That Stole Christmas – Grady guests on "Do They Know It's Christmas?" together with Chino Moreno from Deftones
 1999 – Every Day Life - Moment of Clarity –  Grady guests on the song "Relocate"
 2000 – Soulfly - Primitive – Grady guests on "Pain" together with Chino Moreno from Deftones

Tours
Will Haven have shared the stage with the following artists:
 Beastie Boys
 Coalesce
 Crowbar
 Deep Purple
 Deftones
 Dillinger Escape Plan
 Earth Crisis
 Far
 Fear Factory
 Hatebreed
 Hed PE
 Limp Bizkit
 Neurosis
 One Minute Silence
 Raging Speedhorn
 Slipknot
 Soulfly
 Tinfed
 Tura Satana
 Vision of Disorder

References

External links
 

 
Musical groups established in 1995
Metalcore musical groups from California
Bieler Bros. Records artists
Musical groups from Sacramento, California